Turbinicarpus schmiedickeanus is a species of plant in the family Cactaceae.

Subspecies
, Plants of the World Online accepts the following subspecies, many of which have been treated as separate species:
Turbinicarpus schmiedickeanus subsp. andersonii Mosco
Turbinicarpus schmiedickeanus subsp. bonatzii (Gerhart Frank) Panar., syn. Turbinicarpus bonatzii Gerhart Frank
Turbinicarpus schmiedickeanus subsp. dickisoniae (Glass & R.A.Foster) N.P.Taylor
Turbinicarpus schmiedickeanus subsp. flaviflorus (Gerhart Frank & A.B.Lau) Glass
Turbinicarpus schmiedickeanus subsp. gracilis (Glass & R.A.Foster) Glass
Turbinicarpus schmiedickeanus subsp. jauernigii (G.Frank) D.R.Hunt, syn. Turbinicarpus jauernigii Gerhart Frank
Turbinicarpus schmiedickeanus subsp. klinkerianus (Backeb. & H.Jacobsen) N.P.Taylor
Turbinicarpus schmiedickeanus subsp. macrochele (Werderm.) N.P.Taylor
Turbinicarpus schmiedickeanus subsp. rioverdensis (Gerhart Frank) Zachar, syn. Turbinicarpus rioverdensis Gerhart Frank
Turbinicarpus schmiedickeanus subsp. rubriflorus (Gerhart Frank) Panar.
Turbinicarpus schmiedickeanus subsp. sanchezii-mejoradae García-Mor., Gonz.-Bot. & Vargas-Vázq.
Turbinicarpus schmiedickeanus subsp. schmiedickeanus 
Turbinicarpus schmiedickeanus subsp. schwarzii (Shurly) N.P.Taylor

Distribution
It is endemic to Nuevo León, San Luis Potosí, Tamaulipas states of  northeastern Mexico.  Its natural habitat is hot deserts.

It is threatened by habitat loss.

References

External links
 
 

schmiedickeanus
Cacti of Mexico
Endemic flora of Mexico
Flora of Nuevo León
Flora of San Luis Potosí
Flora of Tamaulipas
Near threatened biota of Mexico
Taxonomy articles created by Polbot